Andrey Yakovlevich Baklan (— 20 May 1985) was a Soviet flying ace during World War II. Awarded the title Hero of the Soviet Union on 23 November 1942 for his initial victories, by the end of the war he tallied an estimated 20 solo and 21 shared shootdowns, although more conservative estimates put the figure at 17 solo and one shared.

References 

1917 births
1985 deaths
Soviet World War II flying aces
Heroes of the Soviet Union
Recipients of the Order of Lenin
Recipients of the Order of the Red Banner
Recipients of the Order of Suvorov, 3rd class
Recipients of the Order of the Red Star